The Ultra Zone is the sixth studio album by guitarist Steve Vai, released on September 7, 1999 through Epic Records.

The Ultra Zone is structurally similar to Vai's previous album, Fire Garden, in that the first half of the album consists mainly of instrumentals, and the second half mainly of vocal songs; however, unlike Fire Garden, The Ultra Zone is not formally divided into two "phases".

Background
The Ultra Zone is notable for its tributes to two legendary guitarists: Frank Zappa (on the track "Frank"), and Stevie Ray Vaughan (on the track "Jibboom").

Also notable is the fact that this was Vai's last studio album of original material until 2005's Real Illusions: Reflections; in the years in between, he released several compilations of his material, as well as a live album.

This album includes the participations of Koshi Inaba and Tak Matsumoto from the Japanese band B'z on "Asian Sky".

Track listing
All songs written by Steve Vai.
 "The Blood & Tears" – 4:26
 "The Ultra Zone" – 4:52 (instrumental)
 "Oooo" – 5:12 (instrumental)
 "Frank" – 5:09 (instrumental) (homage to Frank Zappa)
 "Jibboom" – 3:46 (instrumental) (homage to Stevie Ray Vaughan)
 "Voodoo Acid" – 6:25
 "Windows to the Soul" – 6:25 (instrumental, with some small spoken parts)
 "The Silent Within" – 5:00
 "I'll Be Around" – 4:57
 "Lucky Charms" – 6:44 (instrumental)
 "Fever Dream" – 6:03 (instrumental)
 "Here I Am" – 4:12
 "Asian Sky" – 5:34

Personnel
Steve Vai – everything (tracks 1, 2, 3, 6, 8 & 9), everything else (track 7, 10, 11 & 13), guitars (tracks 4, 5 & 12), vocals (track 12)
Koshi Inaba - vocals (track 13)
Tak Matsumoto - guitar (track 13)
Mike Keneally - keyboards (track 7)
John Sergio – bass (track 4)
Philip Bynoe – bass (tracks 5,7 & 12)
Bryan Beller – bass (tracks 10 & 11)
Gregg Bissonette - drums (track 4)
Mike Mangini - drums (tracks 5, 7 & 12)
Robin DiMaggio - drums (track 10)
Andy Cleaves - trumpet (track 10)
Duane Benjamin - trombone (track 10)
Niels Bye Nielsen - orchestration (track 10)

References

External links
 

Steve Vai albums
1999 albums
Epic Records albums
Instrumental rock albums